Jennifer Jo Cobb (born June 12, 1973) is an American professional stock car racing driver and team owner. She competes part-time in the NASCAR Craftsman Truck Series, driving the No. 10 truck for her own team, Jennifer Jo Cobb Racing. She has also previously competed in the NASCAR Xfinity Series, ARCA Menards Series and the NASCAR Whelen Euro Series.

Racing career
Cobb started racing in 1991 at Lakeside Speedway. Her father, Joe Cobb, races at Lakeside Speedway in the modified division. Since 2002, she has made nine starts in the ARCA Racing Series, including three top-10s in three starts in 2004 while driving for Keith Murt.

In 2004, Cobb made her NASCAR debut in the Busch Series at Homestead-Miami Speedway. She drove the No. 50 Vassarette Chevrolet for Keith Coleman Racing and finished 43rd due to a crash on lap 2.

In 2006, Cobb created a line of clothing for female race fans called Driver Boutique. Proceeds from the sales of this line go towards her racing efforts, and she has attempted to qualify for various Busch and ARCA races in 2007 with the Driver Boutique sponsorship.

On July 19, 2008, she competed in the Camping World Truck Series event at the Built Ford Tough 225. She started in 35th and finished 26 driving the No. 74 Dodge for The Annexus Group completing 144 laps. On April 27, 2009 she competed at the O'Reilly Auto Parts 250 driving the No. 73 Dodge for Derrike Cope Inc. She started 34th and completed 72 laps before experiencing engine trouble, finishing 26th out of 35 drivers winning a purse of $10,680.

In 2010, Cobb announced that she would run full-time in the truck series, after purchasing the assets of the No. 10 truck team from Rick Crawford, whose Circle Bar Racing downsized from a two-truck operation to one — Crawford's own No. 14 (which would also close down early in the season). Cobb kept the same truck number and owner points from Circle Bar. Also that year, Cobb became the highest female points finisher in history in any of the three major NASCAR Series to that time, achieving 17th place.

For 2011, Cobb continued racing her own No. 10 truck full-time in the Camping World Truck Series, and also drove the first 5 races in the Nationwide Series in the No. 79 for 2nd Chance Motorsports. On the truck side, Cobb became the highest finishing female in Truck Series history by finishing 6th at the 2011 NextEra Energy Resources 250. She would hold this record for nine years, when Natalie Decker broke the record with a fifth-place finish, also at the season-opening Daytona race, in 2020. Cobb later announced that she would run the full season with 2nd Chance Motorsports in their No. 79 Ford and run for Rookie of the Year. Cobb later gave her truck's owners points to Chase Mattioli and his team while she also started her own driver development program with Cody Cambensy planning to drive in the Truck Series in 2011. She later left 2nd Chance Motorsports after a dispute with owner Rick Russell over whether to start and park after losing their second car at Las Vegas. Rick Ware Racing later gave her a ride in the No. 41.

In early 2011, Cobb for her own team called Jennifer Jo Cobb Racing and partnered with U.S. Army Family and MWR Command to launch Driven 2 Honor, a promotion honoring women in the U.S. military. Cobb hosted two female service members and their guests at the first five Nationwide races of the 2011 NASCAR season.

2012–2018
In 2012 Cobb ran the entire Camping World Truck Series schedule in the No. 10, along with selected Nationwide Series races in the No. 13. She returned to the Camping World Truck Series for 2013.

For the 2014 season, Cobb again ran in the Truck Series in her own No. 10 Chevrolet Silverado. The team began the season with a 21st-place finish in the NextEra Energy Resources 250. At the SFP 250 Cobb raced to 13th place which earned her highest finish of the season, she then had another strong run at the North Carolina Education Lottery 200 (Charlotte) finishing 16th. However, since that 16th-place finish, the team has seen a decline in performance as they have only managed to eclipse a best of 20th on three occasions (Dover, Kentucky, and Michigan).

Cobb also ran one race in the No. 87 car for Rick Ware Racing at the Kansas Lottery 300 finishing 24th, which was her first Nationwide Series start of 2014.

On May 29, 2015, Cobb angrily approached the race car driven by Tyler Reddick on foot after apparently by being spun out by Reddick's truck at the Lucas Oil 200. It was expected that Cobb would be the first driver penalized under the new NASCAR rule instituted after Kevin Ward Jr. died in a similar incident. She wound up receiving a $5,000 fine from the officials.

During practice for the 2015 Chevrolet Silverado 250 at Canadian Tire Motorsport Park, Cobb crashed and was subsequently caught on camera removing a cell phone from her truck. Cobb was given a P3 penalty by NASCAR for having a non-engine electronic component in her truck. As a result, Cobb was fined $5,000, plus an additional $2,500 for an infraction occurring while still on probation for the incident with Reddick. Cobb was the first driver penalized by NASCAR under the no cell phone rule since it was implemented following the 2012 Daytona 500.

In 2018, Cobb joined Racing Total for her NASCAR Whelen Euro Series debut at Circuit Ricardo Tormo in Valencia.

2020–present
In 2020, Cobb led a career-high 16 laps at Talladega Superspeedway before finishing 24th.

In April 2021, it was announced that Cobb would make her NASCAR Cup Series debut in the spring race at Talladega, driving the No. 15 for Rick Ware Racing. However, NASCAR announced on April 19 that she would not be approved to run the race. This was likely due to how the race itself would have been her first time in a Cup car because of the lack of practice and qualifying. NASCAR also did not approve James Davison and Keith McGee to make their Cup and Truck Series debuts, respectively, at Talladega in 2020 for the same reason. J. J. Yeley would replace Cobb in the RWR No. 15 in the race. That year she withdrew from the Rackley Roofing 200. 2022 began with Cobb again missing the season opener at Daytona. The week of the second race at Las Vegas, Cobb released a statement that she would be scaling her operation back to part time, citing funding and equipment issues.

Personal life
Cobb is married to, but currently separated from, NASCAR crew chief and former driver Eddie Troconis, who was Cobb's crew chief in the Xfinity Series in 2012. They married in 2015. Cobb had reportedly been dating spotter Clayton Hughes at the time of Troconis' arrest in January of 2022 for assaulting Hughes.

Motorsports career results

NASCAR
(key) (Bold – Pole position awarded by qualifying time. Italics – Pole position earned by points standings or practice time. * – Most laps led.)

Xfinity Series

Craftsman Truck Series

Whelen Euro Series – Elite 1

Whelen Euro Series – Elite 2

 Season still in progress
 Ineligible for series points

ARCA Racing Series
(key) (Bold – Pole position awarded by qualifying time. Italics – Pole position earned by points standings or practice time. * – Most laps led.)

References

External links

 
 
 

Living people
1973 births
Sportspeople from Kansas City, Kansas
Racing drivers from Kansas
NASCAR drivers
American female racing drivers
ARCA Menards Series drivers
21st-century American women